Dover is a city in Strafford County, New Hampshire, United States. The population was 32,741 at the 2020 census, making it the largest city in the New Hampshire Seacoast region and the fifth largest municipality in the state. It is the county seat of Strafford County, and home to Wentworth-Douglass Hospital, the Woodman Institute Museum, and the Children's Museum of New Hampshire.

Etymology

First recorded in its Latinised form of Portus Dubris, the word "Dover" derives from the Brythonic word for "waters" (dwfr in Middle Welsh). The same element is present in the word's French (Douvres) and Modern Welsh (Dofr) forms.

History

Settlement

The first known European to explore the region was Martin Pring from Bristol, England, in 1603. In 1623, William and Edward Hilton settled at Pomeroy Cove on Dover Point, making Dover the oldest permanent settlement in New Hampshire, and seventh in the United States. One of the colony's four original townships, it then included Durham, Madbury, Newington, Lee, Somersworth and Rollinsford.

The Hiltons' name survives at Hilton Park on Dover Point (originally known as Hilton Point), where the brothers settled near the confluence of the Bellamy and Piscataqua rivers. They were fishmongers sent from London by the Company of Laconia to establish a colony and fishery on the Piscataqua. In 1631, however, it contained only three houses. William Hilton built a salt works on the property (salt-making was the principal industry in his hometown of Northwich, England). He also served as Deputy to the General Court (the colonial legislature).

In 1633, the plantation was bought by a group of English Puritans who planned to settle in New England, including Viscount Saye and Sele, Baron Brooke and John Pym. They promoted colonization in America, and that year Hilton's Point received numerous immigrants, many from Bristol. They renamed the settlement Bristol. Atop the nearby hill they built a meetinghouse surrounded by an entrenchment, with a jail nearby.

The town was called Dover in 1637 by the new governor, Reverend George Burdett. It was possibly named after Robert Dover, an English lawyer who resisted Puritanism. With the 1639 arrival of Thomas Larkham, however, it was renamed after Northam in Devon, where he had been preacher. But Lord Saye and Sele's group lost interest in their settlements, both here and at Saybrook, Connecticut, when their plan to establish a hereditary aristocracy in the colonies met disfavor in New England. Consequently, the plantation was sold in 1641 to Massachusetts and again named Dover.

Settlers built fortified log houses called garrisons, inspiring Dover's nickname "The Garrison City." The population and business center shifted from Dover Point to Cochecho Falls on the Cochecho River, where its drop of  providing water power for industry (Cochecho means "the rapid foaming water" in the Abenaki language). What is now downtown Dover settlers called Cochecho village.

Cochecho Massacre

On June 28, 1689, Dover suffered a devastating attack by Native Americans. It was revenge for an incident on September 7, 1676, when 400 Native Americans were tricked by Major Richard Waldron into performing a "mock battle" near Cochecho Falls. After discharging their weapons, the Native American warriors were captured. Half were sent to Massachusetts for predations committed during King Philip's War, then either hanged or sold into slavery. Local Native Americans deemed innocent were released, but considered the deception a dishonorable breach of hospitality. Thirteen years passed. When colonists thought the episode forgotten, they struck. Fifty-two colonists, a quarter of the population, were either captured or slain.

Incursions against the frontier town would continue for the next half century. During Father Rale's War, in August and September 1723, there were Indian raids on Saco, Maine, and Dover, New Hampshire. The following year Dover was raided again and Elizabeth Hanson wrote her captivity narrative.

Mill era

Located at the head of navigation, Cochecho Falls brought the Industrial Revolution to 19th-century Dover in a big way. But cotton textile manufacturing actually began about two miles upstream with the Dover Cotton Factory, which was incorporated in 1812, its mill built in 1815. The business would move to Cochecho Falls when it acquired water privileges occupied since the 17th-century by sawmills and gristmills. In 1823 it was renamed the Dover Manufacturing Company, but was not successful. So in 1827 the Cocheco Manufacturing Company was founded (the misspelling a clerical error at incorporation). Expansive brick mills were constructed downtown, linked to receive cotton bales and ship finished cloth when the railroad arrived in 1842. Incorporated as a city in 1855, Dover for a time became a leading national producer of textiles, the mill complex dominating the riverfront and employing 2000 workers.

The mills were purchased in 1909 by the Pacific Mills of Lawrence, Massachusetts, which closed the printery in 1913 but continued spinning and weaving. The printery buildings were demolished in 1913, their site is now Henry Law Park. During the Great Depression, however, textile mills no longer dependent on New England water power began moving to southern states in search of cheaper operating conditions, or simply went out of business. Dover's millyard shut in 1937, then was bought at auction in 1941 by the city itself for $54,000. There were no other bids. Now called the Cocheco Falls Millworks, its tenants include technology and government services companies, plus a restaurant, brewery and bar.

Textile manufacturing in Dover wasn't limited to cotton. In 1824, Alfred I. Sawyer established the Sawyer Woolen Mills beside the Bellamy River. It would expand to include 15 major buildings over 8.5-acres, and by 1883 was the largest woolen manufacturer in the state. In 1889 it was acquired by the American Woolen Company, but closed and was sold off in 1955. The buildings have been repurposed into housing.

Modern era 
With the closing of the mills, the downtown area of Dover sat vacant and lifeless for a long time. With the turn of the century, the city government began to revitalize the area. The Children's Museum of New Hampshire was brought into a disused mill building with a lease of $1 a year. Henry Law Park, a grassy waterfront stretch of land, was given a brand new playground. Small businesses moved into the mills, such as restaurants, toy stores, real estate offices, and barber shops. Old buildings have been refurbished or outright rebuilt to provide new housing. An $87.5 million high school was built to handle the influx of new residents retreating from the high housing prices in Portsmouth. Recently, a plan to develop the waterfront on the other side of the river from the traditional downtown area was approved for $6 million. In early May 2021, waypoint signs were sporadically added to help drivers and walkers navigate Dover with the expansions that are underway.

Antique postcards

Geography and transportation

Dover is drained by the Cochecho and Bellamy rivers, both of which flow into the tidal Piscataqua River, which forms the city's eastern boundary and the New Hampshire–Maine border.

The city is crossed by New Hampshire Routes 4, 9, 16 (the Spaulding Turnpike), 108, and 155, plus U.S. Route 4. It is bordered by the town of Newington to the south (across the inlet to Great Bay), Madbury to the southwest, Barrington and Rochester to the northwest, and Somersworth and Rollinsford to the northeast. South Berwick, Maine, lies to the northeast, across the tidal Salmon Falls River, and Eliot, Maine, is to the east, across the Piscataqua River.

The Cooperative Alliance for Seacoast Transportation (COAST) operates a publicly funded bus network in Dover and surrounding communities in New Hampshire and Maine. C&J Trailways is a private intercity bus carrier connecting Dover with other coastal New Hampshire and Massachusetts cities, including Boston, as well as direct service to New York City. Wildcat Transit, operated by the University of New Hampshire, provides bus service to Durham, which is free for students and $1.50 for the public. Amtrak's Downeaster train service stops at the Dover Transportation Center with service to the Portland Transportation Center, Boston's North Station, and intermediate stops.

Demographics

As of the census of 2020, there were 32,741 people, 14,431 households, and 7,059 families residing in the city. The city grew by 2,754 residents between 2010 and 2020, the third-largest numeric growth of a town or city in New Hampshire, after Manchester and Nashua. The population density in 2020 was 1,224.88 people per square mile (472.93/km2). There were 15,166 housing units at an average density of 567.38 per square mile (219.07/km2). The racial makeup of the city was 87.2% White, 1.7% African American, 0.20% Native American, 5.1% Asian, 0.01% Pacific Islander, 1.2% some other race, and 4.6% from two or more races. Hispanic or Latino of any race were 2.9% of the population.

There were 12,827 households, out of which 27.8% had children under the age of 18 living with them, 40.8% were headed by married couples living together, 10.3% had a female householder with no husband present, and 45.0% were non-families. 31.8% of all households were made up of individuals, and 9.6% were someone living alone who was 65 years of age or older. The average household size was 2.27, and the average family size was 2.89.

In the city, the population was spread out, with 20.3% under the age of 18, 11.0% from 18 to 24, 30.6% from 25 to 44, 24.9% from 45 to 64, and 13.1% who were 65 years of age or older. The median age was 36.7 years. For every 100 females, there were 96.0 males. For every 100 females age 18 and over, there were 94.0 males.

For the period 2009–2011, the estimated median annual income for a household in the city was $55,040, and the median income for a family was $69,980. Male full-time workers had a median income of $51,891 versus $36,167 for females. The per capita income for the city was $30,590. About 6.8% of families and 8.9% of the population were below the poverty line, including 13.2% of those under age 18 and 5.9% of those age 65 or over.

Education

The Dover School District consists of approximately 4000 pupils, attending Horne Street Elementary School, Garrison Elementary School, Woodman Park Elementary School,  Dover Middle School and Dover High School. Dover High's athletic teams are known as "The Green Wave," and the middle school's teams are "The Little Green."

Saint Mary Academy, a Catholic school, has been in downtown Dover since 1912, currently serving about 200 students from pre-kindergarten to 8th grade.  Many students at Saint Mary's subsequently attend St. Thomas Aquinas High School, a Catholic high school located on Dover Point.

Portsmouth Christian Academy is located west of the Bellamy River in Dover, serving preschool through 12th grade.

The Cocheco Arts and Technology Academy (CATA) is a public charter high school with about 100 students. It was formerly located in Barrington, New Hampshire.

The Seacoast Charter School is a publicly funded elementary/middle school that integrates the arts into the core curriculum. The school was founded in 2004 in Kingston, New Hampshire, and relocated to Dover in 2015. Enrollment in January 2016 was 215 students in grades K–8.

Government

In the New Hampshire Senate, Dover is in the 4th District and is currently represented by Democrat David H. Watters. On the New Hampshire Executive Council, Dover is in District 2 and is currently represented by Democrat Cinde Warmington. In the U.S. House of Representatives, Dover is included in New Hampshire's 1st congressional district and is currently represented by Democrat Chris C. Pappas.

Dover is a Democratic stronghold in presidential elections. No Republican presidential nominee has carried Dover since George H. W. Bush’s five-point victory in the town over Michael Dukakis in 1988.

Notable people

In popular culture

Dover was used as the fictional setting for the Hallmark Channel movie Christmas Incorporated.

Dover was the birthplace of the Teenage Mutant Ninja Turtles franchise, created by comic book writers Kevin Eastman and Peter Laird and first published by Mirage Studios—then based in Dover—in 1984.

Historic sites
First Parish Church
Religious Society of Friends Meetinghouse
St. Thomas Episcopal Church
Woodman Institute

See also

 Dover Transportation Center
 McIntosh College
 1987 Little League World Series, when a team from Dover advanced to the quarter-finals

References
Notes

Bibliography

External links

 
 Dover Public Library
 The Many Names of Dover
 Sketch of Dover, New Hampshire
 New Hampshire Economic and Labor Market Information Bureau Profile
 Dover Main Street Community
 LIFE Magazine (Sept. 17, 1971) article about Tuttle farm

Sites of interest
 Greater Dover Chamber of Commerce & Visitor Center
 Children's Museum of New Hampshire
 Hilton Park at Dover Point
 Garrison Hill Tower
 Woodman Institute Museum
 Faces of Dover

 
Cities in New Hampshire
Cities in Strafford County, New Hampshire
County seats in New Hampshire
Populated places established in 1623
1623 establishments in the Thirteen Colonies